The 1868 Louisiana gubernatorial election was held over two days, April 17 and 18, the same days that voters were asked to ratify the new Louisiana Constitution of 1868, which established the civil rights of African Americans. As a result of this election Henry Clay Warmoth was elected Governor of Louisiana. At age 26 he was the youngest governor in the state's history. The result was a lop-sided result for Warmoth because of the Republican Party's overwhelming support among African Americans, who were a majority of the state's population at the time.

Results
Popular Vote

References

1868
Gubernatorial
Louisiana
April 1868 events